Pierre Émile Ernest Brunet (28 June 1902 – 27 July 1991) was a figure skater. Together with his wife Andrée Brunet he won Olympic medals in 1924, 1928 and 1932, as well as four world titles between 1926 and 1932 in pair skating. He also competed in singles, winning the national title in 1924–1931 and finishing seventh-eighth at the 1924 and 1928 Winter Olympics.

Biography
Brunet was born in Paris, France. He and his partner Andrée Joly were the French national champions from 1924 until 1935, and won three Olympic medals. They refused to defend their title at the 1936 Winter Olympics, however, in protest over Nazi Germany. The pair won four World Championships, competing in alternate years.

As a single skater, Brunet won ten national titles. He placed 8th (last) as a single skater at the 1924 Winter Olympics and 7th at the 1928 Winter Olympics.

Brunet and Joly were married in 1929. They had a son, Jean-Pierre, who went on to compete for the United States.

In 1936, Brunet and Joly turned professional. They emigrated to the United States in 1940 and became coaches. Brunet's students included Olympic gold-medal winning skaters Carol Heiss and Scott Hamilton in addition to World Champion Donald Jackson.

Pierre Brunet died in Boyne City, Michigan. He was inducted into the World Figure Skating Hall of Fame in 1976.

Results
Men's singles

Pairs (with Andrée Joly)

References

External links

 Skatabase: 1920s Olympics: Singles Results
 Skatabase: 1920s Olympics: Pairs Results
 Skatabase: 1920s Olympics: Pairs Results
 Pairs on Ice: Andrée Joly & Pierre Brunet

1902 births
1991 deaths
French male single skaters
French male pair skaters
French figure skating coaches
Olympic figure skaters of France
Olympic bronze medalists for France
Olympic gold medalists for France
Figure skaters at the 1924 Winter Olympics
Figure skaters at the 1928 Winter Olympics
Figure skaters at the 1932 Winter Olympics
Olympic medalists in figure skating
World Figure Skating Championships medalists
European Figure Skating Championships medalists
Medalists at the 1924 Winter Olympics
Medalists at the 1928 Winter Olympics
Medalists at the 1932 Winter Olympics
European champions for France
20th-century French people